Protomocerus pulcher is a species of beetle in the family Cerambycidae. It was described by Péringuey in 1892.

References

Prosopocerini
Beetles described in 1892